Tattooed Salome or Salome is an oil on canvas painting by Gustave Moreau, begun in 1874 but never completed - for example the tattoos were added in the painter's last years over the original layer. It is now in the Musée Gustave-Moreau in Paris.

Bibliography
  Geneviève Lacambre, Douglas W. Druick, Larry J. Feinberg and Susan Stein, Gustave Moreau 1826-1898, Tours, Réunion des musées nationaux, 1998

References

Paintings by Gustave Moreau
Paintings depicting Salome
1874 paintings
Oil paintings of the Musée Gustave-Moreau